Partofshikof Island is an island in the Alexander Archipelago of southeastern Alaska, United States. It is part of the City and Borough of Sitka, and lies between the northern part of Kruzof Island and the northwestern part of Baranof Island. It is separated from Kruzof Island by Sukoi Inlet, and separated from Baranof Island by Neva Strait. Partofshikof Island has a land area of 34.177 km2 (13.195 sq mi) and no resident population.

References
 Partofshikof Island: Block 1013, Census Tract 1, Sitka City and Borough, Alaska United States Census Bureau

Islands of the Alexander Archipelago
Islands of Sitka, Alaska
Islands of Alaska